Lenovo P780, also known as the IdeaPhone P780, is an Android-based smartphone designed and produced by Lenovo. It has a large lithium polymer battery pack of 4,000mAh and it is dual sim capable.

Availability
Lenovo P780 was available from June 2013 in colors black and white.

References

External links
How to root Lenovo P780
Lenovo P90

Lenovo
Mobile phones introduced in 2013